"Hey! Baby" is a song written by Margaret Cobb and Bruce Channel, first recorded at Clifford Herring Studios in Ft. Worth Tx, and recorded by Channel in 1961, first released on LeCam Records, a local Fort Worth, Texas label. After it hit, it was released on Smash Records for national distribution. Channel co-produced the song with Major Bill Smith (owner of LeCam) and released it on Mercury Records' Smash label. It reached number 1 on the Billboard Hot 100 for three weeks, starting the week ending March 10, 1962.

The song features a prominent riff from well-known harmonica player Delbert McClinton, and drums played by Ray Torres.  Other musicians on the record included Bob Jones and Billy Sanders on guitar and Jim Rogers on bass. According to a CNN article from 2002, while touring the UK in 1962 with the Beatles, McClinton met John Lennon and gave him some harmonica tips. Lennon put the lessons to use right away on "Love Me Do" and later "Please Please Me". Lennon included the song in his jukebox, and it is also featured on the 2004 related compilation album John Lennon's Jukebox.

"Hey! Baby" was used in the 1987 hit film Dirty Dancing in the scene in which Johnny and Baby dance on top of a log.

Charts

Anne Murray version

Canadian country pop singer Anne Murray covered the song in 1982, reaching number 7 on the US Country Singles chart and number 26 on the Adult Contemporary chart. Murray also reached number 1 on the RPM country and adult contemporary charts in Canada.

Charts

DJ Ötzi version

Austrian artist DJ Ötzi recorded a cover version titled "Hey Baby (Uhh, Ahh)". It was released in July 2000 as the lead single from his debut solo album, Love, Peace & Vollgas. In 2002, it was re-released when it became the unofficial theme song for the 2002 FIFA World Cup. It reached number one in the United Kingdom, Ireland, and Australia. Darts player Tony O'Shea uses it as his walk-on song.

Music video
The official music video features large groups of people singing along to the song in a taxi at different times, interspersed with DJ Ötzi singing on a TV screen. An animated music video was also produced featuring a cartoon version of DJ Ötzi performing with a band of robots while trying to woo a princess.

Track listings
CD Maxi-single (Europe, 2000)
 "Hey Baby" (Uhh, Ahh) (Radio Mix) - 3:36
 "Hey Baby" (Uhh, Ahh) (Club Mix) - 4:15
 "Uh! Ah!" - 3:38

Charts

Weekly charts

Year-end charts

Certifications

Release history

Other versions
 Arthur Alexander on his 1962 album You Better Move On.
 Johnny Hallyday did a rendition, arranged in French, on his 1962 10-inch record Madison Twist.
 Paul and Paula on their 1964 album Paul and Paula Sing For Young Lovers.
 Jerry Lee Lewis, in 1967, for his album Soul My Way.
 New Zealand group the La De Da's covered it in 1967, making the song chart at number one in New Zealand twice.
 NRBQ on their 1969 self-titled debut album for Columbia Records.
 Bobby G. Rice in 1970, which reached number 35 on the country music charts.
 Conway Twitty on his 1970 album Fifteen Years Ago.
 Canadian band Crowbar, in 1972, on their album Heavy Duty.
 Don Partridge on his 1973 album Don Partridge and Friends.
 Ringo Starr released the song as a single, backed with "Lady Gaye", from his Ringo's Rotogravure album, on November 22, 1976, in the US (reaching number 74 US Pop), and on November 26 in the UK.  Record World said that it "should bring some good time sounds to the top of the charts and end the year on a spirited note."  He had also sampled it in his previous chart hit, "A Dose of Rock 'n' Roll" (reaching number 26 US Pop).
 Juice Newton on her 1978 album Well Kept Secret.
 DTV, in 1984, set the Anne Murray version to Peter Pan.
 Alabama on their 1997 album Dancin' on the Boulevard w/guest vocals by Bruce Channel. 
 Cooldown Café, a Dutch band, covered it in 2000; it was top-5 hit in the Netherlands.
 Crazy Frog on his hit follow up 2006 album More Crazy Hits.
 "Hey Baby" has become a popular terrace chant among football supporters, with the lyrics changed to refer to teams or individual players.
 "Hey Baby" was used by fans of professional wrestler Bayley, who chanted it as "Hey Bayley, I wanna know, will you be my girl?"
 DJ Otzi's version of "Hey Baby" was used by Major League Baseball's Colorado Rockies in the 2007 season, played during the seventh inning stretch. The Rockies won the National League pennant that year.

See also
 List of 1960s one-hit wonders in the United States

References
Footnotes

Citations

1961 songs
1961 singles
1962 singles
1976 singles
1982 singles
2001 singles
Songs written by Bruce Channel
Anne Murray songs
Ringo Starr songs
Bobby G. Rice songs
Conway Twitty songs
Juice Newton songs
DJ Ötzi songs
Song recordings produced by Jim Ed Norman
Billboard Hot 100 number-one singles
Cashbox number-one singles
UK Singles Chart number-one singles
Number-one singles in New Zealand
Irish Singles Chart number-one singles
Number-one singles in Australia
Number-one singles in Scotland
Capitol Records singles
Smash Records singles
CBS Records singles
EMI Records singles
Colorado Rockies